George Thompson Scott Stewart (17 February 1927 – 4 June 2011) was a Scottish professional footballer who played as a centre forward.

Career
Born in Buckie, Stewart played for Buckie Thistle, Dundee, St Mirren, Worcester City, Accrington Stanley, Coventry City and Carlisle United. At Accrington Stanley, Stewart broke the club's goalscoring record during the 1955–56 season, scoring 35 goals.

References

1927 births
2011 deaths
Scottish footballers
Buckie Thistle F.C. players
Dundee F.C. players
St Mirren F.C. players
Worcester City F.C. players
Accrington Stanley F.C. (1891) players
Coventry City F.C. players
Carlisle United F.C. players
Scottish Football League players
English Football League players
Association football forwards